Aglaoschema erythrocephala is a species of beetle in the family Cerambycidae. It was described by Napp and Martins in 1988.

References

Aglaoschema
Beetles described in 1988